Church Pond is a small lake located south of Stark. Church Pond is the source of the North Branch Grass River. Fish species present in the lake are brook trout and black bullhead. There are 350 to 400 brook trout stocked per year. Access via state trail off state route 56 on the north shore.

References

Lakes of St. Lawrence County, New York
Lakes of New York (state)